Mar's Castle, also referred to as the Old Castle or Bishop's Palace, was a medieval castle in Aberdeen, Scotland, to the south of the old town, and about  west of the sea.

There are no visible remains of the castle, commonly known as the 'Old Castle'.

History
The original castle was built by the Stewart Earls of Mar.  The Erskines gained the earldom in 1565.  It bore the date 1494.

Up to 1866 there were remains of walls on the site, but are thought not to be strong enough to have belonged to the castle. It was altered considerably in the middle of the 19th century to form houses and shops.

References

Castles in Aberdeen
1494 establishments in Europe
Buildings and structures completed in 1494
Demolished buildings and structures in Scotland
History of Aberdeen